Maggi is an international brand of seasonings, instant soups, and noodles that originated in Switzerland in the late 19th century. The Maggi company was acquired by Nestlé in 1947.

History

Early history 

Julius Maggi (1846–1912) took over his father's mill business in Kemptthal, Switzerland, in 1869. Under his leadership, the business developed into one of the pioneers of industrial food production, with the aim of improving the diet of working-class families through better nutrient supply and faster preparation.

In 1882, at a meeting of the Swiss “Non-Profit Society”, the doctor and factory inspector Fridolin Schuler spoke about the miserable nutritional situation of the factory workers: women workers no longer had enough time to cook for their families; cold meals or alcohol often replaced warm meals; meals were served in factory canteens and were cheap but not sufficiently nutritious. The consequences were malnutrition, stomach diseases, and high infant mortality. Schuler advocated high-protein, easily digestible pulses/legumes. He demanded they should be offered to the working class in a convenient form for quick preparation and at a cheap price. The society turned to the Maggi company, among others.

Julius Maggi experimented for two years with different methods of mechanical and chemical processing of legumes and different mixtures. The results were presented to the representatives of the society on November 19, 1884. They approved the results and signed a contract to exclusively recommend Maggi's legumes for a period of three years. Maggi in turn guaranteed a fixed price and regular product controls for sales in Switzerland. However, great success did not follow. The society was accused of representing the interests of a private company. The Maggi company, on the other hand, had difficulties challenging other suppliers of soup flour on the market, despite the support of the society. 

Since 1884, Maggi has been offering flour made from protein-rich legumes, which can be cooked quickly by being roasted beforehand. Maggi was the first to bring protein-rich legume meals to the market, and followed up with a ready-made soup based on legume meals in 1886. After that Julius Maggi introduced bouillon concentrates, first in capsules, then in cubes. In 1897, Julius Maggi founded the company Maggi GmbH in Singen, Germany.

Expansion 
From 1885 he brought nine industrially produced types of legume flour onto the market. At the Swiss Culinary Art Exhibition in Zurich in 1885 he received the "First Class Diploma". In 1886, the first instant soups based on legume flour and Maggi seasoning followed as competition for the meat extract invented by Justus von Liebig. The first warehouses and branches abroad were founded, including in Singen in Baden in 1887. In order to obtain additional capital for the planned further expansion, the company was converted into a public limited company in 1889 with Julius Maggi as general director. In 1908 Maggi brought the bouillon cube onto the market.

Maggi introduced extensive social benefits that were unusual for the time, such as a canteen, workers' housing, company health insurance, widow's and old-age pensions, and in 1906 Saturdays off. In a strike at the Singen plant in 1907, Julius Maggi successfully mediated, accused the management of having lost "contact with the workforce" and suggested the establishment of a "workers' committee", an early form of the works council. In 1912 Maggi Singen signed the first collective agreement in the German food industry.

Company founder Julius Maggi lived mainly in Paris from 1902 and led the company to great success with new products in France. The sales of pasteurized milk by the "Société laitière Maggi" amounted to 60 million liters in 1912, and the sales of bouillon cubes with the name KUB amounted to 6 million units a month in 1912.

Shortly after Julius Maggi's death in 1912, the company was converted into a holding company, the Allgemeine MAGGI-Gesellschaft.

Recent history 
In 1947, following several changes in ownership and corporate structure, Maggi's holding company merged with the Nestlé company to form Nestlé-Alimentana S.A., currently known in its francophone home base as Nestlé S.A.

By 2020, as part of the Simply Good initiative, the domestic Maggi range is to be geared more towards well-known and healthier ingredients and the salt content to be reduced.

Products

Cube

The bouillon cube or Maggi cube is a meat substitute product that was introduced in 1908.

In Germany, Cameroon, Côte d'Ivoire, Bénin, Gambia, Sénégal, Guinea, Nigeria, Ghana, Burkina Faso, Togo, Sierra Leone, Liberia, Mali, Niger, and Mauritania and parts of the Middle East, Maggi cubes are an integral part of the local cuisine. In Haiti and throughout Latin America, Maggi products, especially bouillon cubes, are widely sold with some repackaging to reflect local terminology. In the German, Dutch, and Danish languages, lovage has come to be known as Maggi herb (Ger. Maggikraut, Du. maggikruid or maggiplant, Da. maggiurt), because it tastes similar to Maggi sauce, although lovage is not present in the sauce.

Seasoning sauce
In Mexico, German-speaking countries, the Netherlands, the Czech Republic, Slovenia, Poland and France, "Maggi" is still synonymous with Maggi-Würze (Maggi seasoning sauce), a dark, soy sauce-type hydrolysed vegetable protein-based condiment sauce. In Spain and Mexico, it is sold under the name Jugo Maggi. There are a total of nine different formulations, which differ between nations and/or regions.

Noodles

Maggi instant noodles are popular in Bangladesh, South Africa, Pakistan, Singapore, Malaysia, Papua New Guinea, Australia, New Zealand, Sri Lanka, Nepal, Bhutan, Maldives and India and are synonymous with instant noodles in most of these countries. Nestle has 39% market share in Malaysia, and had 90% market share in India prior to a nationwide ban by the Food Safety and Standards Authority of India. The ban was later lifted, but market share diminished to 53%. In Malaysia and Singapore, fried noodles made from Maggi noodles are called Maggi goreng. Maggi Instant noodles are branded as "Maggi 2 Minute Noodles" in Australia, South Africa, New Zealand and India.

In India, Maggi Masala noodles carry a green dot, meaning they are specifically formulated to serve vegetarians. However, Maggi chicken noodles carry a red triangle, indicating that they are not vegetarian. This special formulation is not available in other countries, unless imported from India.

In the Philippines, localized versions of Maggi instant noodles were sold until 2011 when the product group was recalled for suspected Salmonella contamination. It did not return to market, while Nestle continues to sell seasoning products including the popular Maggi Magic Sarap.

Recipe mixes
Recipe mixes or so-called Fixes were introduced in Germany in 1974. The product offers to the consumers an idea and a recipe to cook with two or three fresh ingredients and a Maggi mix. A complete step-by-step recipe is given on the back of the package. These products were originally launched in Germany, where they became very popular, and some Western European countries. In the 1990s, recipe mixes were introduced in Eastern Europe, particularly in Russia and Poland (under the Winiary brand), where they became a big success. Nowadays, the portfolio of recipe mixes offers consumers more than a hundred recipe ideas across different European countries.

Maggi noodles safety concerns in India
In May 2015, food safety regulators from Barabanki, a district of Uttar Pradesh, India reported that samples of Maggi 2 Minute Noodles had unexpectedly high levels of monosodium glutamate (MSG), as well as up to 17 times the permissible limit of lead. This finding led to multiple market withdrawals and investigations in India and beyond.

Criticism
Nestlé has faced criticism of its advertising not adhering to marketing regulations in developed countries, and for making misleading claims in developing countries. In October 2008, Nestlé aired a commercial meant for Bangladeshi television on British TV. The advert made false claims that the noodles would "help to build strong muscles, bone, and hair". The British Advertising Standards Authority stated that the advertisement did not abide by the new EU consumer protection legislation, by which advertisers have to provide proof of health claims.

See also
 List of instant noodle brands
 List of Nestlé brands

References

External links

 
 Nestle Global Website

Cham, Switzerland
Culinary Heritage of Switzerland
Instant noodle brands
Haitian cuisine
Malaysian cuisine
Nestlé brands
Swiss brands
Umami enhancers
1947 mergers and acquisitions